František (Franta) Juhan (1914-1992) was a Czechoslovak motorcycle racer in speedway, road racing and trials.

Career

He has won the Golden Helmet of Pardubice in 1938 and was a member of the 1937 medal-winning Czechoslovakian Six Days Trials Team.

He was the brother of the famous Porsche racer and Pan America champion Jaroslav Juhan. Jaroslav won for Porsche  also raced a Ferrari Testarossa 250TR in 1958 at Le Mans.

In Jaraslov's book "Life Without Brakes The man who brought Porsche to the Carrera" by Jan Králík and published Grada Publishing there is a section on Franta.

https://www.youtube.com/watch?v=1waIq7Ko8LE&list=PLsNlN6Y46p_rZBTowLTLIbIyHURQov1Aa

Juhan raced most of the historic brands of the era including Jawa, Vincent, Gilera, Moto Guzzi and MV Agusta.

He immigrated to Vancouver (British Columbia, Canada), where he became a businessman. He founded the award-winning Honda Centre in 1965.

Franta Juhan raced in the Isle of Man TT in 1935 and 1938. In 1938 he raced a Velocette.

In 1948, he won the Grand Prix of Europe in Bern (Switzerland), riding a Velocette KTT 350 in which he set a new lap record.

The Juhan family were all winners Franta Juhan and his son Frankie Juhan in Motorcycles and Jaroslav Juhan on four wheels with Ferrari and Porsche, https://www.youtube.com/watch?v=eBVlR_nryqQ&list=PLsNlN6Y46p_oFlFRsE_m_SOxFtrNXyMcj&index=55

References 
6: Gold Hemet Picture from Frankie Juhan

Czechoslovak motorcycle racers
Czechoslovak emigrants to Canada
1914 births
1992 deaths
Sportspeople from Pardubice